The 1984–85 UEFA Cup was the 14th season of the UEFA Cup. It was won by Real Madrid, who gained an aggregate victory over Videoton of Hungary in a two-legged final.

Changes
Spain +1
Netherlands -2
Scotland +1
Czechoslovakia +1
East Germany -1
Poland +1
Greece -1
Albania renounced for English title holders

Teams

  LASK
  SSW Innsbruck
  Standard Liège
  Club Brugge
  Anderlecht
  CSKA Septemvriysko Zname
  Sliven
  Apollon Limassol
  FC Bohemians
  Dukla Banská Bystrica
  Dukla Prague
  Odense BK
  AGF
  Queens Park Rangers
  Manchester United
  Nottingham Forest
  Tottenham Hotspur
  Southampton
  HJK
  AS Monaco
  Paris Saint-Germain
  Auxerre
  Vorwärts Frankfurt
  Lokomotive Leipzig
  Köln
  Borussia Mönchengladbach
  Werder Bremen
  Hamburger SV
  Olympiacos
  Rába ETO Győr
  Videoton
  KR
  Fiorentina
  Internazionale
  Red Boys Differdange
  Rabat Ajax
  Ajax
  PSV Eindhoven
  Glentoran
  Lillestrøm
  Pogoń Szczecin
  Widzew Łódź
  Braga
  Sporting CP
  Bohemian F.C.
  Universitatea Craiova
  Sportul Studenţesc
  Dundee United
  Rangers
  Hearts
  Dinamo Minsk
  Spartak Moscow
  Atlético Madrid
  Real Betis
  Real Madrid
  Real Valladolid
  AIK
  Östers IF
  Sion
  Neuchâtel Xamax
  Fenerbahçe
  Željezničar Sarajevo
  FK Partizan
  NK Rijeka

First round

|}

First leg

Second leg

Videoton won 1–0 on aggregate.

Queens Park Rangers won 7–0 on aggregate.

1–1 on aggregate; Universitatea Craiova won 5–3 on penalties.

Lokomotive Leipzig won 7–3 on aggregate.

Köln won 3–1 on aggregate.

Željezničar won 5–2 on aggregate.

Spartak Moskva won 7–2 on aggregate.

Dinamo Minsk won 10–0 on aggregate.

Partizan won 4–0 on aggregate.

Rijeka won 4–2 on aggregate.

CSKA Septemvriysko Zname won 4–3 on aggregate.

Bohemians ČKD Praha won 8–3 on aggregate.

Manchester United won 5–2 on aggregate.

PSV Eindhoven won 3–2 on aggregate.

Widzew Łódź won 2–1 on aggregate.

Fiorentina won 3–0 on aggregate.

Borussia Mönchengladbach won 7–3 on aggregate.

Standard Liège won 3–1 on aggregate.

Club Brugge won 1–0 on aggregate.

Olympiacos won 3–2 on aggregate.

Linzer ASK won 2–0 on aggregate.

Real Madrid won 5–2 on aggregate.

Hamburg won 2–0 on aggregate.

Sporting CP won 4–2 on aggregate.

Ajax won 14–0 on aggregate.

Dundee United won 3–1 on aggregate.

Rangers won 4–3 on aggregate.

Paris Saint-Germain won 6–2 on aggregate.

2–2 on aggregate; Anderlecht won on away goals.

Internazionale won 2–1 on aggregate.

Sion won 4–2 on aggregate.

Tottenham Hotspur won 9–0 on aggregate.

Second round

|}

First leg

Second leg

Spartak Moskva won 3–1 on aggregate.

2–2 on aggregate; Dinamo Minsk won 5–3 on penalties.

1–1 on aggregate; Bohemians ČKD Praha won 4–2 on penalties.

3–3 on aggregate; Widzew Łódź won on away goals.

Hamburg won 6–1 on aggregate.

6–6 on aggregate; Partizan won on away goals.

Universitatea Craiova won 2–0 on aggregate.

Anderlecht won 7–3 on aggregate.

Željezničar won 3–2 on aggregate.

Köln won 4–1 on aggregate.

Internazionale won 4–3 on aggregate.

Dundee United won 7–2 on aggregate.

Manchester United won 1–0 on aggregate.

Tottenham Hotspur won 4–2 on aggregate.

Real Madrid won 4–3 on aggregate.

Videoton won 5–2 on aggregate.

Third round

|}

First leg

Second leg

Željezničar won 4–2 on aggregate.

Tottenham Hotspur won 3–1 on aggregate.

Videoton won 5–2 on aggregate.

Dinamo Minsk won 2–1 on aggregate.

Köln won 2–1 on aggregate.

2–2 on aggregate; Internazionale won on away goals.

Manchester United won 5–4 on aggregate.

Real Madrid won 6–4 on aggregate.

Quarter-finals

|}

First leg

Second leg

1–1 on aggregate; Videoton won 5–4 on penalties.

Željezničar won 3–1 on aggregate.

Internazionale won 4–1 on aggregate.

Real Madrid won 1–0 on aggregate.

Semi-finals

|}

First leg

Second leg

Videoton won 4–3 on aggregate.

Real Madrid won 3–2 on aggregate.

Final

First leg

Second leg

Real Madrid won 3–1 on aggregate.

References

External links
1984–85 All matches UEFA Cup – season at UEFA website
Official Site
Results at RSSSF.com
 All scorers 1984–85 UEFA Cup according to protocols UEFA
1984/85 UEFA Cup – results and line-ups (archive)

UEFA Cup seasons
2